Vee-Jay Records is an American record label founded in the 1950s, located in Chicago and specializing in blues, jazz, rhythm and blues and rock and roll.

The label was founded in Gary, Indiana, in 1953 by Vivian Carter and James C. Bracken, a husband-and-wife team who used their initials for the label's name. Vivian's brother, Calvin Carter, was the label's A&R man. Ewart Abner, formerly of Chance Records, joined the label in 1955, first as manager, then as vice president, and ultimately as president.  One of the earliest African American-owned record companies, Vee-Jay quickly became a major R&B label, with the first song recorded, the Spaniels' "Baby It's You,"  making it to the top ten on the national R&B charts.

Notable artists
Major acts on the label in the 1950s included blues singers Jimmy Reed, Memphis Slim, and John Lee Hooker, and rhythm and blues vocal groups the Spaniels, the Dells, and the El Dorados. The 1960s saw the label become a major soul label with Jerry Butler, Gene Chandler, Dee Clark, and Betty Everett having hit singles on both the pop and R&B charts. Vee-Jay was also the first label to nationally issue a record by the Pips (through a master purchase from the tiny Huntom label of Atlanta), who became Gladys Knight and the Pips in 1962 when they moved to Fury Records.

Vee-Jay had significant success with pop/rock and roll acts, such as the Four Seasons (their first non-black act) and the Beatles. Vee-Jay acquired the rights to some of the early recordings by the Beatles through a licensing deal with EMI, as the American affiliate Capitol Records was initially uninterested in the group. The main attraction at the time, however, was another EMI performer, Frank Ifield. Calvin Carter later said, "There was a number one record over in England at the time—It was 'I Remember You' by Frank Ifield. We took the record, and as a throw in, they had a group and asked us if we would take them, too. The group turned out to be the Beatles and we got a five-year contract on the Beatles as a pickup on the Frank Ifield contract."

In the mid-1960s, Vee-Jay signed the former successful child singer Jimmy Boyd, known for the hit "I Saw Mommy Kissing Santa Claus"; Boyd was then twenty-five years old. The company ventured into folk music with Hoyt Axton and New Wine Singers, and also picked up Little Richard who re-recorded his Specialty hits and recorded (1965) "I Don't Know What You've Got (But It's Got Me)", an R&B success, with Jimi Hendrix, Don Covay, Bernard Purdie, Ronny Miller, and Billy Preston (before Hendrix became successful on his own).

Vee-Jay's jazz line accounted for a small portion of the company's releases, but recorded such artists as Eddie Harris, Wynton Kelly, Lee Morgan, and Wayne Shorter. The A&R for the label's jazz releases was Sid McCoy. The company also had a major gospel line, recording such acts as the Staple Singers, The Famous Boyer Brothers, the Argo Singers, Swan Silvertones, the Caravans, Dorothy Love Coates and the Gospel Harmonettes, and Maceo Woods. Vee-Jay even released comedy on LP, with records by Dick Gregory, and Them Poems, Mason Williams' early nightclub act, recorded with a studio audience in 1964.

Early history
Calvin Carter set up Vee-Jay's first rehearsal space in a garage at 47th Street and King's Drive in 1953, then discovered and signed Jimmy Reed. Carter also established a regular studio use arrangement with Universal Recording Corporation, one of the largest independent recording studios in the U.S..

Success
Vee-Jay's biggest successes occurred from 1962 to 1964, with the ascendancy of the Four Seasons and the distribution of early Beatles material ("From Me to You" b/w "Thank You Girl," "Please Please Me" b/w "From Me to You," and "Do You Want to Know a Secret" b/w "Thank You Girl" via Vee-Jay; and "Love Me Do" b/w "P.S. I Love You" and "Twist and Shout" b/w "There's a Place" via its subsidiary Tollie Records), because EMI's autonomous United States company Capitol initially refused to release Beatles records. Vee-Jay's releases were at first unsuccessful, but quickly became huge hits once the British Invasion took off in early 1964, selling 2.6 million Beatles singles in a single month. Cash flow problems caused by Ewart Abner's tapping the company treasury to cover personal gambling debts led to the company's active demise; Vee-Jay had been forced to temporarily cease operations in the second half of 1963, leading to royalty disputes with the Four Seasons and EMI. The Four Seasons then left Vee-Jay for Philips Records, and EMI's Capitol Records picked up the U.S. rights for both the Beatles and Frank Ifield.

Other Vee-Jay subsidiary labels included Interphon (which yielded the Top 5 hit "Have I the Right?" by another British group, the Honeycombs), and Oldies 45 for reissues along with Tollie and Abner Records, which was an early subsidiary label formed in 1958. Vee-Jay also did distribution for Champion Records (notable for producing the original version of Tainted Love) as well as Rick Hall's Fame Records and, for a time, the Memphis label Goldwax Records and Johnny Vincent's Ace Records.

Vee-Jay moved back to Chicago in 1965 after a year in Los Angeles. Liens were placed on Vee-Jay assets still in Los Angeles after legal action by Pye Records due to non-payment of royalties.

As Vee-Jay International
Vee-Jay Records filed for bankruptcy in August 1966. The assets were subsequently purchased by label executives Betty Chiappetta and Randy Wood (not the Dot Records founder), who changed its name to Vee-Jay International. From 1967 to 1972, Vee-Jay was limited to selling some of the inventory on hand when the company went under, and leasing or licensing the Vee Jay masters to Buddah Records, who came out with "The First Generation" series, and Springboard International, who issued dozens of albums featuring Vee Jay material on their subsidiary label, Upfront. In the 1970s, Vee Jay International itself re-released a number of titles on LPs and 8-track tapes.

In 1978, Vee Jay issued a Silver Anniversary catalog to commemorate the 25th anniversary of the label.

1980s–present
The label was revived under new management in 1982 as a dance and R&B label, but closed down in 1986.

In the mid-late 1980s, a one-hour independent documentary film was made called "Cradle of Rock and Roll" aired on PBS soon after the film's completion.  It covered the history of Vee-Jay and Chess Records in Chicago, which helped to begin a revival of some interest in Vee-Jay's history and catalog.   In 1986 Motown licensed 26 of Vee Jay's soul, blues and R&B hits for a CD compilation, "Hits from the Legendary Vee Jay Records."

In 1993, the Vee Jay Limited Partnership released a 3-CD boxed set, "The Vee Jay Story (Celebrating 40 Years of Classic Hits)," again drawn from the label's R&B, soul, and blues catalog. The package includes a red-vinyl facsimile 45 of the Spaniels' "Goodnite Sweetheart Goodnite."

Under the management of Michele Tayler, the company was reactivated in 1998 as The Vee-Jay Limited Partnership. Its main office is located in Redding, Connecticut.

Collectables Records has been remastering and reissuing Vee-Jay albums on audio CD since 2000. A compilation which contains a Best of Vee-Jay box set as well as individual "Best of the Vee-Jay Years" CDs is released by Shout! Factory.

In July 2014 its catalogue was acquired by Concord Music Group. The sale was facilitated by Minneapolis film producer, Scott McLain.

The Vee-Jay Records story is featured on the documentary series Profiles of African-American Success.

Subsidiaries

Abner Records was a subsidiary of Vee-Jay Records. It was originally named Falcon Records, but the name was changed in 1958 since there already existed a Falcon Records.  The label was named after Ewart Abner who was general manager at Vee-Jay, 1955–1961. Falcon Records Scotland (2011–present) is a sub-label of Jilted Generation Inc. Falcon Records launched October 2011 in partnership with "Music Media Management" owned by Diania Elliott Tomlin Perkins & Eric Bryce, "In Hoodz We Trust (IHWT)" owned by Jay Supa & "Make Noise Fife" owned by Alex Herbert.

Discography

Vee-Jay LP/SR-1000 Main Series
The Vee-Jay LP/SR 1000 Series of 12 inch LPs were released between 1958 and 1963 with a catalog prefix of LP for mono releases and SR for stereo.

Vee-Jay LP/SR-3000 Jazz Series
In 1960 Vee-Jay began issuing jazz records with separate catalog numbers as the LP/SR 3000 Series of 12 inch LPs with a catalog prefix of LP for mono releases and SR for stereo.

Vee-Jay LP/SR-5000 Gospel Series
Between 1959 and 1965 the Vee-Jay LP/SR-5000 Gospel Series released seventy-eight 12 inch LPs.

Vee-Jay VJLP/VJS-1000 Main Series
From 1963 the Vee-Jay 1000 Series of 12 inch LPs were released with a catalog prefix of VJLP for mono releases and VJS for stereo.

Vee-Jay LP/SR-2500 Jazz Series
From 1964 to 1965 the Vee-Jay 2500 Series of 12 inch Jazz LPs were released with a catalog prefix of LP for mono releases and SR for stereo.

Vee-Jay International World of Jazz VJS-3000 Jazz Series
Between 1974 and 1978 the Vee-Jay International World of Jazz 3000 Series released twenty-three 12 inch stereo LPs. Many of these were previously unreleased sessions or live recordings, compilations of previously released material or  re-releases of albums from other labels.

Vee-Jay International VJS-18000 Gospel Series
In 1975 Vee-Jay International VJS-18000 Gospel Series released eleven 12 inch LPs.

See also
 List of record labels
 :Category:Vee-Jay Records albums
 :Category:Vee-Jay Records artists

References

External links
 Discography for Vee-Jay Records
 The Vee-Jay Story - Both Sides Now website
Vee-Jay Records on the Internet Archive's Great 78 Project

American record labels
Record labels established in 1953
Record labels disestablished in 1966
Record labels established in 1982
Record labels disestablished in 1986
Record labels established in 1998
Re-established companies
History of Gary, Indiana
Jazz record labels
Blues record labels
Rhythm and blues record labels
Rock and roll record labels
Concord Music Group
1953 establishments in Indiana